Lymantria fuliginosa is a moth of the family Erebidae first described by Frederic Moore in 1883. It is found in Sri Lanka and India.

References

Lymantria
Moths of Asia
Moths described in 1883